Ukrainian nationalism refers to the promotion of the unity of Ukrainians as a people and the promotion of the identity of Ukraine as a nation state. The origins of modern Ukrainian nationalism emerge during the 17th-century Cossack uprising against the Polish–Lithuanian Commonwealth led by Bohdan Khmelnytsky. Ukrainian nationalism draws upon a single national identity of culture, ethnicity, geographic location, language, politics (or the government), religion, traditions and belief in a shared singular history, that dates back to the 9th century.

History

Nationalism emerged after the French Revolution while modern day Ukraine faced external pressure from the suzerainty of the Polish–Lithuanian Commonwealth, the Tsardom of Russia and the Ottoman Empire but the National Identity dates back to the 9th century.

Pre History
During the Iron Age, numerous tribes settled on the modern-day territory of Ukraine. In the first millennium BC, these tribes included the Cimmerians who settled the Dnieper river valley. On the Black Sea coast, the Greeks founded numerous colonies, such as Yalta. The Scythians, a semi-nomadic Iranic people who were from the Eurasian region known as Scythia, as well as Slavs and Varangians.

The Ukrainian Language is an East Slavic language of the Indo-European language family. The Ukrainian language was formed by convergence of tribal dialects from a common Proto-Slavic language, mostly due to an intensive migration of the population from the 6th to the 9th century. The Varangians began referring to themselves as Rus as an identify separate from other East Slavic tribes.

Kiev Rus 
During the 9th century the Varangians spread down the Dnipro River in the area of Kyiv and began to establish an identity as raids were made on Constantinople. During this time a religious identity began to grow.

While the Varangians were not of Slavic descent, the  adoption of Orthodox Christianity by Volodymyr the Great further strengthened the cultural links between the East Slavic tribes and created precursors to Ukrainian nationalism and identity such as a shared religious architecture. Volodymyr, who ruled Kievan Rus' from 980 to 1015, built a pagan temple on a hill in Kiev dedicated to six gods: Perun—the god of thunder and war, a god favored by members of the prince's druzhina (military retinue)"; Slav gods Stribog and Dazhd'bog; Mokosh—a goddess representing Mother Nature "worshipped by Finnish tribes"; Khors and Simargl, "both of which had Iranian origins, were included, probably to appeal to the Poliane." The Primary Chronicle reports that, in the year 986, Vladimir met with representatives from several religions and settled on Eastern Christianity.

At the height of Kievan Rus' the state became the biggest in Eastern Europe cementing Ukrainian identity. Literature flourished, producing the Galician–Volhynian Chronicle. Advancement in law occurred with the Slavic code of Russkaya Pravda. Religious architecture, which would become symbolism of nationalism also got built such as  Saint Sophia Cathedral in Kiev and Saint Sophia Cathedral in Novgorod. Education in the area of Ukraine also got established at the founding of the Kiev Pechersk Lavra (monastery), which functioned in Kievan Rus' as an ecclesiastical academy.

Kingdom of Ruthenia 

The Kingdom of Ruthenia, or Kingdom of Galicia–Volhynia, became the successor of Kievan Rus' and played a strong role in fermenting Ukrainian nationalism. The Principality united the western and southern branches of East Slavs, consolidating their identity and becoming a new center of political and economic life after the decline of Kiev.

Zaporozhian Cossacks 

The Cossacks played a strong role in solidifying Ukrainian identity during the Polish–Lithuanian Commonwealth. The Zaporozhian Cossacks lived on the Pontic–Caspian steppe below the Dnieper Rapids (Ukrainian: za porohamy), also known as the Wild Fields. They have played an important role in European geopolitics, participating in a series of conflicts and alliances with the Polish–Lithuanian Commonwealth, Russia, and the Ottoman Empire.

The Cossacks emerged as protection against Tartar raids but were given greater rights as their influence grew. Cossacks revolted as the Polish Kings tried to enforce Catholicism and Polish language on the people of Ukraine. 
Precursors to Ukrainian Nation State identity emerged as Bohdan Khmelnytsky (c. 1595–1657), commanded the Zaporozhian Cossacks and led the Khmelnytsky Uprising against Polish rule in the mid-17th century. Khmelnytsky introduced a prop-government based on a form of democracy which had been practised by Cossacks since the 15th century.

After a conflict between Ottoman-Polish and Polish-Muscovite Principalities, the official Cossack register decreased. This, together with intensified socioeconomic and national-religious oppression of the other classes in Ukrainian society, led to a number of Cossack uprisings in the 1630s. These eventually culminated in the Khmelnytsky Uprising, led by the hetman of the Zaporizhian Sich, Bohdan Khmelnytsky.

Cossack Hetmanate 

As a result of the mid–17th century Khmelnytsky Uprising, the Zaporozhian Cossacks briefly established an independent state, which later became the autonomous Cossack Hetmanate (1649–1764). It was placed under the suzerainty of the Russian Tsar from 1667, but was ruled by local hetmans for a century. The principal political problem of the hetmans who followed the Pereyeslav Agreement was defending the autonomy of the Hetmanate from Russian/Muscovite centralism. The hetmans Ivan Vyhovsky, Petro Doroshenko and Ivan Mazepa attempted to resolve this by separating Ukraine from Russia.

These conflicts created the conditions for Ukrainian nationalism as Bohdan Khmelnytsky spoke of the liberation of the "entire Ruthenian people". Following the uprisings and establishment of the Hetmanate state, Hetman Ivan Mazepa (1639–1709) focused on the restoration of Ukrainian culture and history during the early 18th century. Public works included the Saint Sophia Cathedral in Kyiv, and the elevation the Kyiv Mohyla Collegium to the status of Kyiv Mohyla Academy in 1694.

During the reign of Catherine II of Russia, the Cossack Hetmanate's autonomy was progressively destroyed. After several earlier attempts, the office of hetman was finally abolished by the Russian government in 1764, and his functions were assumed by the Little Russian Collegium, thus fully incorporating the Hetmanate into the Russian Empire.

On May 7, 1775, Empress Catherine II issued a direct order that the Zaporozhian Sich was to be destroyed. On June 5, 1775, Russian artillery and infantry surrounded the Sich and razed it to the ground. The Russian troops disarmed the Cossacks, and the treasury archives were confiscated. The Koshovyi Otaman, Petro Kalnyshevsky, was arrested and incarcerated in exile at Solovetsky Monastery. This marked the end of the Zaporozhian Cossacks.

Russian and Austrio-Hasburg Empires 
An intense period of russification began for the areas of the Hetmanate. After 1785 the Romanov dynasty made a conscious effort to assimilate the Ruthenian and Cossack elites by granting them noble status within the Russian Empire. This led to a decline of the Ukrainian language among ruling elite. Ukrainian language and culture was preserved through folks stories and songs. After the three partitions of the Polish-Lithuanian Commonwealth, the regions of Galicia (Halychyna) and Bukovina became part of the Habsburg Empire. Ukrainians living within the Austrian state did not face the same cultural repression and were influenced by the nationalism that spread after the French Revolution and the American Revolution.

After the Revolutions of 1848 in the Austrian Empire, the Ruthenian Council tried to establish a Ukrainian nation but this effort was thwarted. National identities developed among Belarusians, Ukrainians, and Carpatho-Rusyn (Czheck).

World War I

With the collapse of the Russian Empire, a political entity which encompassed political, community, cultural, and professional organizations was established in Kyiv from the initiative from the Association of the Ukrainian Progressionists (TUP). This entity was called the Tsentralna Rada (Central Council) and was headed by the historian Mykhailo Hrushevskyi. On 22 January 1918, the Tsentralna Rada declared Ukraine an independent country.  However, this government did not survive very long because of pressures not only from Denikin's Russian White Guard but also the Red Army, German, and Entente intervention, and local anarchists such as Nestor Makhno and Green Army of Otaman Zeleny.

Interwar period in Soviet Ukraine
As Bolshevik rule took hold in Ukraine, the early Soviet government had its own reasons to encourage the national movements of the former Russian Empire. Until the early 1930s, Ukrainian culture enjoyed a widespread revival due to Bolshevik concessions known as the policy of Korenization ("indigenization"). In these years an impressive Ukrainization program was implemented throughout the republic. In such conditions, the Ukrainian national idea initially continued to develop and even spread to a large territory with traditionally mixed population in the east and south that became part of the Ukrainian Soviet Socialist Republic.

At the same time, despite the ongoing Soviet-wide anti-religious campaign, the Ukrainian national Orthodox Church was created, the Ukrainian Autocephalous Orthodox Church. The church was initially seen by the Bolshevik government as a tool in their goal to suppress the Russian Orthodox Church, always viewed with great suspicion by the regime for its being the cornerstone of the defunct Russian Empire and the initially strong opposition it took towards the regime change. Therefore, the government tolerated the new Ukrainian national church for some time and the UAOC gained a wide following among the Ukrainian peasantry.

These events greatly raised the national consciousness of the Ukrainians, and brought about the development of a new generation of Ukrainian cultural and political elite. This in turn raised the concerns of Soviet dictator Joseph Stalin, who saw danger in the Ukrainians' loyalty towards their nation competing with their loyalty to the Soviet State, and in the early 1930s "Ukrainian bourgeois nationalism" was declared to be the primary problem in Ukraine. The Ukrainization policies were abruptly and bloodily reversed, most of the Ukrainian cultural and political elite was arrested and executed, and the nation was decimated with the famine called the Holodomor.

Interwar period in the West
After World War I, what is now Ukraine was annexed by the newly created Second Polish Republic and by the Soviet Union. Both governments continued to view Ukrainian nationalism as a threat. In March 1926, Vlas Chubar (Chairman of the Council of People's Commissars of Soviet Ukraine), gave a speech given in Kharkiv and later repeated it in Moscow, in which he warned of the danger that Symon Petliura, the exiled former President of the Ukrainian People's Republic, represented to the Soviet Government. It was as a result of this speech that the command was allegedly given to assassinate Petliura on French soil.

On 25 May 1926, at 14:12, by the Gibert bookstore, Petliura was walking on Rue Racine near Boulevard Saint-Michel of the Latin Quarter in Paris and was approached by Sholom Schwartzbard. Schwartzbard asked in Ukrainian: "Are you Mr. Petliura?" Petliura did not answer but raised his walking cane. As Schwartzbard claimed in court, he pulled out a gun and shot him five times.

Petliura was buried alongside his wife and daughter in the Cimetière du Montparnasse in Paris, France. According to senior KGB defector Peter Deriabin, Schwartzbard was a Soviet secret police (GPU) operative and was acting on the orders of Soviet Ambassador to France, Christian Rakovsky. Schwartzbard's handler in preparing for the targeted killing of Petliura was fellow GPU agent Mikhail Volodin, who arrived in France August 8, 1925 and who was subsequently in close contact with Schwartzbard.

News of Petliura's assassination triggered massive uprisings in Soviet-ruled Ukraine, particularly in Boromlia, Zhehailivtsi, (Sumy province), Velyka Rublivka, Myloradov (Poltava province), Hnylsk, Bilsk, Kuzemyn and all along the Vorskla River from Okhtyrka to Poltava, Burynia, Nizhyn (Chernihiv province) and other cities. These revolts were brutally suppressed by the Soviet Government. The blind kobzars Pavlo Hashchenko and Ivan Kuchuhura Kucherenko composed a duma (epic poem) in memory of Symon Petliura. To date Petliura is the only modern Ukrainian politician to have a duma created and sung in his memory. This duma became popular among the kobzars of left-bank Ukraine and was also sung by Stepan Pasiuha, Petro Drevchenko, Bohushchenko, and Chumak.

The core defense at the Schwartzbard trial, as presented by the noted French jurist Henri Torres, was that Petliura's assassin was avenging the deaths of his parents and the other Jewish victims of pogroms committed by Petliura's soldiers, whereas the prosecution (both criminal and civil) tried to show that Petliura was not responsible for the pogroms and that Schwartzbard was a Soviet spy. After a trial lasting eight days the jury acquitted Schwartzbard.

In the 1920s, the Polish government had closed Ukrainian schools and failed to fulfill the promise of national autonomy for Ukrainians. Tadeusz Hołówko, an advocate of concessions to the Ukrainian minority, was assassinated by the Organization of Ukrainian Nationalists (OUN) to prevent Polish-Ukrainian rapprochement. Hołówko was killed while staying in a guest house owned by nuns of the Ukrainian Greek Catholic Church at Truskawiec on 29 August 1931. He was one of the victims of an assassination campaign waged by the OUN. His death, widely discussed in the Polish press, the international press, and even at a League of Nations session,  was part of a vicious circle involving the OUN's violence and sabotage and the Second Polish Republic's brutal repression of ethnic-Ukrainians. Some time later, a senior Polish police commissioner investigating Hołówko's assassination, Emilian Czechowski, also became an OUN assassination victim. In the early 1930s, OUN members carried out more than 60 successful or attempted assassinations, many of them targeted at Ukrainians who opposed the organization's policies (for example a respected pedagogue Ivan Babij).

In 1933, the OUN retaliated against the Soviet State for the Holodomor by assassinating Alexei Mailov, a Soviet consular official stationed in Polish-ruled Lviv. On 15 June 1934, Poland's Minister of the Interior, Bronisław Pieracki, was also assassinated by the faction led by Stepan Bandera within the Organization of Ukrainian Nationalists. Poland's Sanation government retaliated by creating, two days after the assassination, the Bereza Kartuska Prison. The prison's first detainees were the leadership of the opposition National Radical Camp (the ONR), who were arrested on 6–7 July 1934. Many Ukrainian nationalists and Polish critics of the ruling party soon joined them there. Stepan Bandera and Mykola Lebed were arrested, tried, and sentenced to death for Pieracki's assassination. Their sentences were later commuted to life imprisonment.

On 23 May 1938, OUN leader Yevhen Konovalets was assassinated by the NKVD inside a Rotterdam cafe. Konovalets was inside the cafe meeting with Pavel Sudoplatov, an NKVD mole who had infiltrated the OUN, and who gave Konovalets a bomb rigged to explode inside a box of chocolates. Sudoplatov walked calmly away, waited until he heard the bomb explode, then walked calmly to the nearest train station, and left the city. Sudoplatov later alleged in his memoirs to have been personally ordered by Joseph Stalin to assassinate Konovalets as revenge for the 1933 assassination at the Soviet consulate in Lviv. Stalin also felt that Konovalets was a figure maintaining the unity of the OUN and that his death would cause the organization to become further factionalized, torn apart, and annihilated from within.

Due to his sudden disappearance, the OUN immediately suspected Sudoplatov of Konovalets' murder. Therefore, a photograph of Sudoplatov and Konovalets together was distributed to every OUN unit. According to Sudoplatov, "In the 1940s, SMERSH ... captured two guerilla fighters in Western Ukraine, one of whom had this photo of me on him. When asked why he was carrying it, he replied, 'I have no idea why, but the order is if we find this man to liquidate him.'" Just as Stalin had hoped, the OUN following Konovalets' murder split into two parts. The older, more moderate members supported Andriy Melnyk and the OUN-M, while the younger and more radical members supported Stepan Bandera's OUN-B.

World War II
With the outbreak of war between Nazi Germany and the Soviet Union in 1941, many nationalists in Ukraine thought that they would have an opportunity to create an independent country once again. An entire Ukrainian volunteer division of the SS had been created. Many of the fighters who had originally looked to the Nazis as liberators, quickly became disillusioned and formed the Ukrainian Insurgent Army (UPA), which waged military campaign against Germans and later Soviet forces as well against Polish civilians. The primary goal of OUN was "the rebirth, of setting everything in order, the defense and the expansion of the Independent Council of Ukrainian National State." The OUN also revived the sentiment that "Ukraine is for Ukrainians." In 1943, the UPA adopted a policy of massacring and expelling the Polish population. The ethnic cleansing operation against the Poles began on a large scale in Volhynia in late February, or early spring, of that year and lasted until the end of 1944. 11 July 1943 was one of the deadliest days of the massacres, with UPA units marching from village to village, killing Polish civilians. On that day, UPA units surrounded and attacked 99 Polish villages and settlements in the counties of Kowel, Horochów, and Włodzimierz Wołyński. On the following day, 50 additional villages were attacked. On 30 June 1941, the OUN, led by Stepan Bandera, declared an independent Ukrainian state. This was immediately acted upon by the Nazi army, and Bandera was arrested and imprisoned from 1941 to 1944.

There has been much debate as to the legitimacy of UPA as a political group. UPA maintains a prominent and symbolic role in Ukrainian history and the quest for Ukrainian independence. At the same time it was deemed an insurgent or terrorist group by Soviet historiography.

Ukrainian Canadian historian Serhiy Yekelchyk writes that during 1943 and 1944 an estimated 35,000 Polish civilians and an unknown number of Ukrainian civilians in the Volhynia and Chelm regions fell victim to mutual ethnic cleansing by the UPA and Polish insurgents. Niall Ferguson writes that around 80,000 Poles were murdered then by Ukrainian nationalists. In his book Europe at War 1939–1945: No Simple Victory, Norman Davies puts the number of Poles killed by Ukrainian nationalists between 200,000 and 500,000, while Timothy Snyder writes that Ukrainian nationalists killed "between forty to sixty thousand Polish civilians in Volhynia in 1943."

1945–1953
In the post-World War II era, Stalin would still be the leader until his death in 1953. Early on in this era, the policy of Zhdanovschina was instituted, or the cultural-ideological purification of the Soviet Union. In the Ukrainian variant of this, any vestiges of nationalism were suppressed. Media that had been produced during the war to encourage Ukrainian patriotism, such as Ukraine in Flames, was denounced.

1953–1972
The Khrushchev Thaw started after Stalin's death. Under him, the first works of Samizdat appeared, and various people of Ukraine, whether it be ethnic Ukrainians, Crimean Tartars, and Jews, started publishing literature on both human rights and national/cultural rights issues.  Under Petro Shelest, who became leader of the Ukrainian SSR from 1963 to 1972, there was a revival of Ukrainian culture particularly in the '60s, as some decision making was allowed for a time to moved back to Kyiv from the center (Moscow). The Shevchenko National Prize was created, with Oles Honchar as the first awardee. The Ukrainian Sixtiers would be an important new generator of intelligentsia that appeared during this time, and had similarities to the Beat Generation in the west in cultural impact on later groups.

There was also a resurgence of Ukrainian nationalist thought, associated with dissident writers such as Viacheslav Chornovil, Ivan Dziuba and Valentyn Moroz, which the authorities tried to stamp out through threats, arrests, and prison sentences.

1972–1985
Volodymyr Shcherbytsky took power over the Ukrainian SSR in 1972 until 1989. He was a member of the Politburo of the Communist Party of the Soviet Union, and a close friend of Leonid Brezhnev. As such, he was a very influential person in the Soviet Union, and led a very reactionary administration, aimed at centralizing power and suppressing dissent.

In 1975, the Helsinki Accords was passed, calling for a pan-European security structure. In 1976, Ukrainian Helsinki Group was formed to promote human rights, and this created a new nascent dissident movement.

1985–1990
Under Mikhail Gorbachev, a new era of Perestroika and Glasnost was instituted primarily to fix structural problems with the Soviet economy. In Ukraine, one year under Gorbachev, in April 1986, the disaster at Chornobyl occurred, and this incident did much to delegitimize the power of both the Communist Party and Volodymyr Shcherbytsky locally, after he ordered the children of the central committee and the Communist Party away from Kyiv to the Caucausus, while the city celebrated May Day. It also put Ukraine back on the world map, as the disaster was seen as an ecological problem not only locally, but potentially globally as well. The tragedy also started mobilizing the diaspora.

1991–2014
As opposed to the Soviet era, when nationality was understood in primarily ethnic terms where to be Ukrainian was something one would purely inherit, a gradual shift towards Civic nationalism started in 1991 with the birth of the modern Ukrainian state. Ukraine chose to adopt pluralistic citizenship laws, which made everyone within its territorial borders a citizen, rejecting the model of Latvia and Estonia which adopted German-style ethnic citizenship laws which disenfranchised (self-identified) ethnic Russians. There has also been a gradual shift of self-identification of Russiophone Ukrainians away from a "Russian" self-identification. Even in the early 2000s, people from the Russian-speaking Odesa would often self-identify as "Russian" to foreigners and migrants, but not to Russians from the Russian Federation, indicating changes in identity.

In the first decade of the 21st century, voters from Western Ukraine and Central Ukraine tended to vote for pro-Western and pro-European general liberal national democrats, while pro-Russian parties got the vote in Eastern Ukraine and Southern Ukraine. From the 1998 Ukrainian parliamentary election until the 2012 Ukrainian parliamentary election, no nationalist party obtained seats in the Verkhovna Rada (Ukraine's parliament). In these elections, nationalist right-wing parties obtained less than 1% of the votes; in the 1998 parliamentary election, they obtained 3.26%.

The nationalist party Svoboda had an electoral breakthrough with the 2009 Ternopil Oblast local election, when they obtained 34.69% of the votes and 50 seats out of 120 in the Ternopil Oblast Council. This was the best result for a far-right party in Ukraine's history. In the previous 2006 Ternopil Oblast local election, the party had obtained 4.2% of the votes and 4 seats. In the simultaneous 2006 Ukrainian local elections for the Lviv Oblast Council, it had obtained 5.62% of the votes and 10 seats and 6.69% of the votes and 9 seats in the Lviv city council. In 1991, Svoboda was founded as the Social-National Party of Ukraine. The party combined radical nationalism and alleged neo-Nazi features. Under Oleh Tyahnybok, it was renamed and rebranded in 2004 as the All-Ukrainian Association Svoboda. Political scientists Olexiy Haran and Alexander J. Motyl contend that Svoboda is radical rather than fascist and they also argue that it has more similarities with far-right movements like the Tea Party movement than it has with either fascists or neo-Nazis. In 2005, Victor Yushchenko appointed Volodymyr Viatrovych head of the Ukrainian security service (SBU) archives. According to professor Per Anders Rudling, this not only allowed Viatrovych to sanitize ultra-nationalist history but also to officially promote its dissemination along with OUN(b) ideology, which is based on "ethnic purity" coupled with anti-Russian, anti-Polish, and antisemitic rhetoric. The extreme right-wing now capitalizes on Yushchenkoist propaganda initiatives. This includes Iuryi Mykhal'chyshyn, an ideologue who proudly confesses that he is a part of the fascist tradition. The autonomous nationalists focus on recruiting young people, participating in violent actions, and advocating "anti-bourgeoism, anti-capitalism, anti-globalism, anti-democratism, anti-liberalism, anti-bureaucratism, anti-dogmatism." Rulig suggested that Ukrainian President Viktor Yanukovych, sworn in on 25 February 2010, "indirectly aided Svoboda" by "granting Svoboda representatives disproportionate attention in the media."

In the 2010 Ukrainian local elections, Svoboda achieved notable success in Eastern Galicia. In the 2012 parliamentary election, Svoboda came in fourth with 10,44% (almost a fourteenfold of its votes compared with the 2007 Ukrainian parliamentary election) of the national votes and 38 out of 450 seats. Following the 2012 parliamentary election, Batkivshchyna and UDAR cooperated officially with Svoboda.

2014–2022
During the ongoing Russo-Ukrainian War, Russian media attempted to portray the Ukrainian party in the conflict as neo-Nazi, with Russian president Vladimir Putin claiming in early 2022 that Ukraine was an 'artificial country run by Nazis'. Scholars such as historians and political scientists generally regard such claims as unfounded. Dutch historian of Ukraine Marc Jansen stated in 2022: 'There are far-right, anti-Semitic parties in Ukraine, but they play no significant role in the national government.' Although certain neo-Nazi-like groups such as the Azov Battalion participated in Euromaidan (alongside many other groups), and some were incorporated into the Ukrainian military and deployed in Donbas, that didn't make the Zelenskyy government 'neo-Nazis', said Jansen, who pointed out that Volodymyr Zelenskyy (elected president in 2019) is Jewish and his family has suffered in the Holocaust, with several relatives being killed by the Nazis. The main Ukrainian organisations involved with a neo-Banderaite legacy are Svoboda, Right Sector, and Azov Battalion. Andriy Biletsky, the head of the ultra-nationalist and neo-Banderaite political groups Social-National Assembly and Patriots of Ukraine, was also the first commander of the Azov Battalion and the Azov Battalion is part of the Ukrainian National Guard fighting pro-Russian separatists in the War in Donbass. According to a report in The Daily Telegraph, some individual anonymous members of the battalion identified themselves as sympathetic to the Third Reich. In June 2015, Democratic Representative John Conyers and his Republican colleague Ted Yoho offered bipartisan amendments to block the U.S. military training of Ukraine's Azov Battalion.

After President Yanokovych's ouster in the February 2014 Ukrainian revolution, the interim Yatsenyuk Government placed four Svoboda members in leading positions; Oleksandr Sych as Vice Prime Minister of Ukraine, Ihor Tenyukh as Minister of Defense, lawyer Ihor Shvaika as Minister of Agrarian Policy and Food, and Andriy Mokhnyk as Minister of Ecology and Natural Resources of Ukraine. In a 5 March 2014 fact sheet, the U.S. State Department stated that "[f]ar-right wing ultranationalist groups, some of which were involved in open clashes with security forces during the Euromaidan protests, are not represented in the Ukrainian parliament."

In the 2014 Ukrainian presidential election and 2014 Ukrainian parliamentary election, Svoboda candidates failed to meet the electoral threshold to win. The party won six constituency seats in the 2014 parliamentary election and obtained 4.71% of national election list votes. In the 2014 presidential election, Svoboda leader Oleh Tyahnybok received 1.16% of the vote. Right Sector leader Dmytro Yarosh gained 0.7% of the votes in the 2014 presidential election, and was elected to parliament in the 2014 parliamentary election as a Right Sector candidate by winning a single-member district. Right Sector spokesperson Boryslav Bereza as an independent candidate also won a seat and district.

The Euromaidan Revolution of Dignity, the Russian annexation of Crimea and the ongoing Russo-Ukrainian War in Donbas have in the post-2014 years led to profound political, socio-economic and cultural-religious consequences for Ukrainian society. While it was a divided bilingual country between 1991 and 2014, the occupied parts became increasingly (pro-)Russian and the unoccupied parts more pro-European, pro-western and more monolingually Ukrainian. Unoccupied Ukraine developed into an increasingly united society, characterised to a large extent by its opposition to the government of Putin and to a lesser extent Russia, the Russian language and culture. In October 2018, there was also a schism between the Russian Orthodox Church and the Ecumenical Patriarchate of Constantinople when the latter granted autonomy to the Orthodox Church of Ukraine. According to historian Marc Jansen (2022): 'It is precisely because of the war in eastern Ukraine, which has been raging since 2014, that Ukraine has become a largely unified country. Putin has done more for Ukrainian nation-building than anyone else.' Other scholars also noted an acceleration of civic nationalism in a broad spectrum of Ukrainian society, such as political scientist Lowell Barrington of Marquette University, who said this type of nationalism bonds people through "feelings of solidarity, sympathy and obligation" rather than ethnicity. According to political scientist Oxana Shevel, author of the 2021 book From ‘the Ukraine’ to Ukraine, this was a result of aggression by Russia: 'In a paradoxical twist, Putin is basically unifying the Ukrainian nation.' This was also reflected in sociological data, despite Ukraine not having conducted a census since 2001.

The radical nationalists group С14, whose members openly expressed neo-Nazi views, gained notoriety in 2018 for being involved in violent attacks on Romany camps.

On 19 November 2018, Svoboda and fellow Ukrainian nationalist political organizations Organization of Ukrainian Nationalists, Congress of Ukrainian Nationalists, Right Sector, and C14 endorsed Ruslan Koshulynskyi's candidacy in the 2019 Ukrainian presidential election. In the election, Ruslan Koshulynskyi's and all united nationalist party received 1.6% of the votes. In the 2019 Ukrainian parliamentary election, a united party list with the nationalist right-wing parties Svoboda, Right Sector, Governmental Initiative of Yarosh, and National Corps completely failed elections with 2.15% of the votes and did not received enough votes to clear the 5% election threshold, and thus lost all seats in Verkhovna Rada. Svoboda did win one constituency seat in the election. Boryslav Bereza and Dmytro Yarosh lost their parliamentary seats.

Volodymyr Zelenskyy won the 2019 presidential election in Ukraine. He ran for the Servant of the People party which has previously argued for "mild Ukrainization".

2022 Russian invasion of Ukraine

During the 2022 Russian invasion of Ukraine there has been a large increase in pro-Ukrainian position inside Ukraine. In other countries, the Ukrainian flag has been used to show support for the Ukrainian cause during the war. There was also a rapid shift in pro-Ukrainian attitudes in the eastern part of the country, including people vowing to use the Ukrainian language more. A study of survey data from 2019, 2021, and 2022 indicated that the eight-year war and major Russian invasion had strengthened pro-European and pro-democratic civic identity, rather than ethnolinguistic or ethnonational identity.

A derussification campaign swept through Ukraine following the February 2022 invasion. Among other renamings, in the central Ukrainian city Dnipro the Schmidt Street (the street was originally the Gymnasium Street but it was renamed to Otto Schmidt Street by Soviet authorities in 1934) was renamed to Stepan Bandera Street. Meanwhile several Ukrainian cities removed statues and busts of the 19th-century Russian poet Alexander Pushkin.

Public school curriculum are no longer prescribing works by Russian authors, and publishing books written by Russian nationals was outlawed.

Nationalist political parties

Current
People's Movement of Ukraine (1990–present)
Ukrainian National Assembly – Ukrainian People's Self-Defence (1990–present)
Congress of Ukrainian Nationalists (1992–present)
All-Ukrainian Union "Freedom" (1995–present)
All-Ukrainian Union "Fatherland" (1999–present)
Ukrainian People's Party (2002–present)
Ukrainian Republican Party (2006–present)
Radical Party of Oleh Liashko (2010–present)
Right Sector (2013–present)
People's Front (2014–present)
National Corps (2016–present)

Defunct
Ukrainian Radical Party (1890–1950)
Revolutionary Ukrainian Party (1900–1905)
Borotbists (1918–1920)
Ukrainian Communist Party (1920–1925)
All-Ukrainian Political Movement "State Independence of Ukraine" (1990–2003)
Social-National Party of Ukraine (1991–2004)
UKROP (2015–2020)

In literature
One of the most prominent figures in Ukrainian national history, the Ukrainian poet Taras Shevchenko, voiced ideas of an independent and sovereign Ukraine in the 19th century.  Taras Shevchenko used poetry to inspire cultural revival to the Ukrainian people and to strive to overthrow injustice. Shevchenko died in Saint Petersburg on 10 March 1861, the day after his 47th birthday. Ukrainians regard him as a national hero, becoming a symbol of the national cultural revival of Ukraine. Beside Shevchenko, numerous other poets have written in Ukrainian. Among them, Volodymyr Sosyura stated in his poem Love Ukraine (1944) that one cannot respect other nations without respect for one's own.

Bibliography 

 John Alexander Armstrong, Ukrainian Nationalism, Columbia University Press, 1963;
 John-Paul Himka, Galician Villagers and the Ukrainian National Movement in the Nineteenth Century, Palgrave Macmillan, 1988;
 Taras Hunczak, The Ukraine, 1917-1921: A Study in Revolution, Harvard University Press, 1990.
 John-Paul Himka, Religion and Nationality in Western Ukraine: The Greek Catholic Church and the Ruthenian National Movement in Galicia, 1867–1900, McGill–Queen's University Press, 1999;
 Taras Hunczak, Ukraine: The Challenges of World War II, University Press of America, 2003
 Norman Davies, Europe at War 1939–1945: No Simple Victory, Macmillan Publishers, 2006;
 Timothy D. Snyder, Bloodlands: Europe Between Hitler and Stalin, Basic Books, 2010;
 Grzegorz Rossoliński-Liebe, Stepan Bandera: The Life and Afterlife of a Ukrainian Nationalist. Fascism, Genocide, and Cult, Ibidem Press, 2014;
 John-Paul Himka, Ukrainian Nationalists and the Holocaust, Ibidem Press, 2021.
 Taras Hunczak, On The Horns Of A Dilemma: The Story of the Ukrainian Division Halychyna, University Press of America, 2021.

See also

Antisemitism in Ukraine
Anti-Ukrainian sentiment
Far-right politics in Ukraine
Greater Ukraine
Neo-Nazism in Ukraine
Racism in Ukraine
Ukrainian National Revival
Ukrainization
Ukrainophilia
De-Stalinization
Russia–Ukraine relations
Russo-Ukrainian War
Chronology of Ukrainian language suppression

References

Notes

Further reading

Alexander F. Tsvirkun History of political and legal Teachings of Ukraine, Kharkiv, 2008.
John Alexander Armstrong, "Ukrainian Nationalism", Columbia University Press, 1963, .
Alexander J. Motyl, "The turn to the right : the ideological origins and development of Ukrainian nationalism, 1919–1929", Published: Boulder, [Colo. : East European quarterly] ; New York : distributed by Columbia University Press, 1980, .
Kenneth C. Farmer, "Ukrainian nationalism in the post-Stalin era : myth, symbols, and ideology in Soviet nationalities policy", Kluwer Boston, 1980, .
Andrew Wilson, "Ukrainian Nationalism in the 1990s: A Minority Faith", Cambridge University Press, 1996, .
Ernst B. Haas, "Nationalism, Liberalism, and Progress", Cornell University Press, 1997, Chapter seven: Russia and Ukraine, pp. 324–410.
Ronald Grigor Suny, Revenge of the Past: Nationalism, Revolution, and the Collapse of the Soviet Union", Stanford University Press, 1993, .
Paul Robert Magocsi, "The Roots of Ukrainian Nationalism: Galicia As Ukraine's Piedmont", University of Toronto Press, 2002, .
Stephen, Velychenko, "Putin Preludes. Secret Russian Police Reports on the Ukrainian National Movement," <Stephen Velychenko. PUTIN PRELUDES. Secret Russian Police Reports on the Ukrainian National Movement>.
Andrew Wilson, "The Ukrainians: Unexpected Nation", Yale University Press, 2002, .

External links
Ukrainian Patriot's Credo, a poem by Basil Bucolic
Oleksandr Palchenko. Ukrainian nation and Ukrainian people. First Social Agreement.
"Bourgeois nationalists": as they were depicted by the Soviet propaganda. Ukrayinska Pravda 

 
Independence movements
Nationalist movements in Europe
Nationalism
Nationalism